Cheiromyia is a genus of flies in the family Dolichopodidae. It is found in the Neotropical realm. It was originally named Cheirocerus by Octave Parent in 1930, but was renamed to Cheiromyia by C. E. Dyte in 1980 after it was found to be preoccupied by the catfish genus Cheirocerus (Eigenmann, 1917).

Species
Cheiromyia bicornis Brooks in Brooks, Cumming & Pollet, 2010
Cheiromyia brevitarsis Brooks in Brooks, Cumming & Pollet, 2010
Cheiromyia carolina Limeira-de-Oliveira & Brooks, 2018
Cheiromyia fuscipennis Pollet & Brooks, 2018
Cheiromyia laselva Brooks in Brooks, Cumming & Pollet, 2010
Cheiromyia nordestina Limeira-de-Oliveira & Cumming, 2018
Cheiromyia palmaticornis (Parent, 1930)
Cheiromyia pennaticornus (Parent, 1931)

Cheiromyia maculipennis (Van Duzee, 1934) was transferred to Paraclius in 2010.

References

Dolichopodinae
Dolichopodidae genera
Diptera of South America